The Philippine hanging parrot (Loriculus philippensis), also commonly known as the colasisi from its local Tagalog name "kulasisi", is a small psittaculid parrot species endemic to the Philippines. It includes about eleven subspecies, at least one of which might represent a distinct species, although further research is needed. While it is listed as Least Concern in IUCN, some subspecies, such as L. p. chyrsonotus of Cebu and L. p. siquijorensis of Siquijor, may already be extinct. The species is threatened by habitat loss, but a bigger threat is trapping for the illegal wildlife trade; wild-caught birds are often sold as pets in streets and online selling groups. 

Philippine hanging parrots are mainly green with areas of red, orange, yellow, and blue on the head and breast varying between subspecies. Males have a red breast patch, except for the population living on Camiguin, where both males and females (like females of the other subspecies) lack red on the breast. They make nests in tree holes and, unusually for a parrot, the female takes nesting material back to the nest.

Description
They are mainly green with areas of red, orange, yellow, and blue varying between subspecies. The forehead is red and the irises are dark brown. Adults have red beaks and orange legs except for Loriculus (philippensis) bonapartei which have black beaks and grey legs. They are sexually dimorphic with only the males having red on their chin or upper chest, except for the Loriculus (philippensis) camiguinensis in which neither the male or female has a red bib or chest. Juveniles have less red on their heads and paler beaks, but otherwise resemble the female.

Taxonomy
The species or species complex was initially described by Statius Müller in 1776. The exact taxonomy listing is unclear.

Loriculus philippensis (Statius Muller) 1776
 Loriculus philippensis apicalis Souance 1856
 Loriculus (philippensis) bonapartei Souance 1856 (Black-billed hanging parrot) - sometimes considered as a subgenus or subspecies of the L. philippensis or another species of Loriculus.
 Loriculus philippensis bournsi McGregor 1905
 Loriculus philippensis chrysonotus Sclater, PL 1872 (Cebu hanging parrot) †
 Loriculus philippensis dohertyi Hartert 1906
 Loriculus philippensis mindorensis Steere 1890
 Loriculus philippensis philippensis (Statius Muller) 1776
 Loriculus philippensis regulus Souance 1856
 Loriculus philippensis siquijorensis Steere 1890 †
 Loriculus philippensis worcesteri Steere 1890
 ?Loriculus (philippensis) camiguinensis Tello, JG 2006 (Camiguin hanging parrot) - usually considered a separated species of Loriculus, L. camiguinensis

In 2006, hanging parrots living on the island of Camiguin, off the northern coast of Mindanao, were described and thought to have a separate identity, Loriculus (philippensis) camiguinensis; however, more research and DNA analysis is required to clarify their taxonomy. There is also uncertainty over the taxonomy of Loriculus (philippensis) bonapartei which has been classified as a subspecies or a species in different classifications.

Distribution and habitat
The Philippine hanging parrot is native to the Philippines except the Sulu Archipelago and it is not widespread on Palawan. The different subspecies are native to different islands, and some subspecies are rare or almost extinct. Trading of birds between the islands for pets has resulted in escaped pets living on different islands to where they originated.

Its natural habitats are tropical moist lowland forests, bamboo forest and tropical moist montane forest. It also occupies human-modified habitats including coconut groves and secondary forest. It is most common in lowland areas, being rare above 1250 m.

Behaviour and ecology

Philippine hanging parrots are usually encountered alone or in pairs, rarely in small groups. They mostly forage for food in the canopy or middle storeys of forests, and their diet is composed of nectar and flowers as well as soft fruits such as those from figs (Ficus).

The species is a season breeder, with nesting occurring from March to May. Like most parrots it is a cavity nester; a nest found in the wild was in a cavity high up in a dead tree. However, it is one of the few species of parrots that uses nesting material in the nest, the female tucks nesting material between feathers in order to take it back to the nest. In captivity the clutch size was 3 eggs which are incubated for 20 days. The chicks take around 35 days to fledge after hatching. The rounded eggs measure about 18.7 x 16.4 mm.

References

 Tello, J.G., Degner, J.F., Bates, J.M. & Willard, D.E. 2006. A new species of hanging-parrot (Aves: Psittacidae: Loriculus) from Camiguin Island, Philippines. Fieldiana Zoology 106:49-57.

External links 
 
 Oriental Bird Images: Philippine Hanging Parrot  Selected photos

Philippine hanging parrot
Endemic birds of the Philippines
Philippine hanging parrot
Taxonomy articles created by Polbot